Kfar Tavor is a village in the Lower Galilee region of Northern Israel, at the foot of Mount Tabor. Founded in 1901, it was awarded local council status in 1949. As of 2017, nearly all of its citizens are Jewish.

History
Ceramics from the Byzantine era have been found here.

In the early 9th century, under Abbasid rule, Abu Salih Khayr al-Khadim, a eunuch of Caliph al-Mu’tazz b’illah, left all his property in Kfar Tavor (then called Kafr Tabaria) and another Galilee village, Kafr Kanna, to a waqf (religious endowment). The endowments were supposed to be eternal, but were presumably ended by the conquest of the Crusaders in 1099.

Ottoman period

Arab village
In the Ottoman era there was a village here called Mes'ha.  In 1596 the village appeared under the name of "Masha" in the  tax registers as part of the nahiya (subdistrict) of Tabariyya in the Sanjak (district) of Safad. It  was noted as "hali"(=empty), but a  fixed tax-rate of 25% on agricultural product was paid. These products  included wheat, barley and cotton; the taxes totalled 3,300 akçe.  In 1799 it  appeared as Mechi  on the map Pierre Jacotin compiled that year.

In 1881, the Palestine Exploration Fund's Survey of Western Palestine described "Meshah" village with a population of 100 Muslims, with houses chiefly of basalt stone, and a few of adobe and stone. The village was situated on an arable plain, without trees. The water supply was from a cistern in the village.

Jewish village

Kfar Tavor was established in 1901 by pioneers of the First Aliya under the auspices of the Jewish Colonization Association.  Twenty-eight farmers settled in the area with the assistance of the philanthropist Baron Edmond de Rothschild. The new settlement was originally known as Mes'ha, the name of the nearby Arab village. It was renamed in 1903 at the urging of Zionist leader Menachem Ussishkin who visited the site and was surprised to find it had no Hebrew name. At first, there was some debate over whether to use the term kfar ("village"), which some residents thought would bode badly for future growth. Ussishkin responded that he had visited the German town of Düsseldorf, which had also originated as a Dorf, or village, but was now a full-fledged city.
The Rothschild administration determined that the site was ideal for cultivating grapes. The vineyards of Kfar Tavor became a supplier of grapes to the country's wineries.

On 12 April 1909 a group of Bar Giora members left Sejera, were they had been based, and met in secret at Kfar Tavor. Led by Israel Shochat and Yitzhak Ben-Zvi it was decided to establish an armed militia - Hashomer. Its members were to act as guards for Jewish colonies and work as laboured towards establishing further colonies.

British Mandate era

In the 1922 census of Palestine conducted by the British Mandate authorities, Mesha (Kufr Tabur)  had a population of 274; all Jews. The 1931 census of Palestine recorded 328 persons in Mas-ha living in 54 houses: 304 Jews, 20 Muslims and 4 Christians.

In the  1945 statistics  Kfar Tavor had 230 inhabitants, all Jews. Mas-ha was noted as an alternative name.

Landmarks
In the Hameyasdim neighborhood, the core of the village, there is a museum and other sites, including the HaShomer house, the first school and teacher's house (now a library) and a synagogue that was built in 1937. Another school, built in 1911, now serves as the Shenkar Tzfira Music Center. The main street of the neighborhood has houses left from the village's early days, as well as parts of the wall that surrounded it.

Notable residents

Yigal Allon (1918–80), politician, commander of the Palmach, and general in the IDF, was born in Kfar Tavor.
 Oz Blayzer (born 1992), basketball player
Itay Segev (born 1995), basketball player

References

Bibliography

External links
Photo of Mes'ha (Kfar Tavor) from 1910
Survey of Western Palestine, Map 6:  IAA, Wikimedia commons

Local councils in Northern District (Israel)
Populated places established in 1901
Lower Galilee
Mount Tabor